Frank Shelton "Red" Perkins (December 26, 1890 – September 27, 1976) was an American jazz trumpet player, singer, and bandleader. Perkins led of one of the oldest Omaha, Nebraska-based jazz territory bands, The Dixie Ramblers, and saw his greatest period of success in the 1920s and 1930s.

Early life 
Perkins, who was African-American, was born in Muchakinock, Iowa, a coal mining camp near Oskaloosa, Iowa. As an adult, Perkins moved from Oskaloosa to Fort Dodge, Iowa.

In 1917, Perkins moved with his wife and child to Omaha, Nebraska. He got a job as a porter at a barber shop and worked there from 1917 to 1925.

Career 

In 1923, Perkins took over the Omaha Night Owls jazz band and renamed them the Dixie Ramblers. Perkins based his band in Omaha's Near North Side. It was a small band with six players but several of the musicians doubled on different instruments. The Dixie Ramblers quickly grew into a medium-sized jazz territory band.

The National Orchestra Service booked the band from 1923 into the 1940s. In 1932, he joined with harmonica player O.P. Alexander and they performed on radio station WFAA until 1934. Perkins and his band were signed by RCA Victor in 1936 and later released music on Gennett Records. The band cut more than 250 sides of records. The band played in ballrooms, theaters, and hotels in Nebraska, Iowa, Kansas, South Dakota, and North Dakota.
  
One of the Dixie Rambler's most famous songs was "Hard Times Stomp." The jazz band was known for its variety acts and floor shows.

Perkins' bookings were handled by National Orchestra Service of Omaha, Nebraska.

Personal life 
Towards the end of the big band era in the late 1940s, Perkins moved to Minneapolis, Minnesota and became a professional photographer. He died September 27, 1976 in Minneapolis, Minnesota.

Selected discography 
During the 1920s and 1930s, the Dixie Ramblers recorded for Gennett Records.

 Red Perkins and His Dixie Ramblers
 Frank "Red" Perkins (t, as, ss, v) dir. Joe Drake (t, cl, ts, arr), Andre C. Oglesby (tb), Jesse Simmons (cl, as ,ts), Howard Fields (p), Charles “Goodie” Watkins (bjo, gtr), Eugene Freels (t, bb), Harry Rooks (d-x), trio (v).

 Richmond, Indiana, May 5, 1931
 17727-A: "Hard Times Stomp" (Perkins) Ch 40044
 17728-A: "My Baby Knows How" (Davis-Akst-Richman) - vFP Ch 16661

 Richmond, Indiana, May 6, 1931
 17729-A: "Old Man Blues" (Paul, Ellington, Mills) - v3 Ch 40044
 17730: "Minor Blues" (Perkins) Ch 16288

Members of The Dixie Ramblers 
 Anna Mae Winburn, singer
 Bill Osboen
 Charlie "Big" Green, trombone
 Charlie Watkins
 Harry Fooks
 Jabbo Smith, trumpet
 Jay Green
 Jim Alexander

References

External links 
 

American jazz bandleaders
American jazz trumpeters
American male trumpeters
American bandleaders
Big band bandleaders
Western swing performers
Swing bandleaders
Musicians from Omaha, Nebraska
Gennett Records artists
King Records artists
People from Mahaska County, Iowa
People from Omaha, Nebraska
Musicians from Minneapolis
1890 births
1976 deaths
20th-century American conductors (music)
20th-century American singers
20th-century trumpeters
Singers from Minnesota
Jazz musicians from Minnesota
Jazz musicians from Nebraska
20th-century American male singers
American male jazz musicians
Musicians from Iowa